Inlet is a hamlet located in the Town of Inlet in Hamilton County, New York, United States. It is situated at the eastern end of the Fourth Lake and in the valley connecting the Fourth, Fifth and Sixth Lakes of the Fulton Chain of Lakes.

References

Hamlets in Hamilton County, New York
Hamlets in New York (state)